The Hauraki Rift is an active NeS-to NWeSE-striking rift valley system in the North Island of New Zealand that has produced the Firth of Thames and the Hauraki Plains.

Geology

The rift valley in the north appears to be delimited in the west by the line of the Firth of Thames Fault and to the east by the Hauraki Fault. The mountains of the Coromandel (which include andesitic and basaltic back arc volcanoes) and Kaimai Range to the east and the Hunua Range to the west give it the appearance of a full graben although it has also been described as a simple structure of 2 to 3 half-grabens.  However the apparent line in the south of the Firth of Thames Fault no longer follows the apparent horst structure to the west and some believe the line of the Waikato River after it leaves the old Taupō Rift gives a better guide to the western line of the rift as structures have been heavily modified in the last 26,000 years in the south, and the Waikato River historically used the graben in its route to the sea. The active intra-rift Kerepehi Fault in the southern portion of the Hauraki Rift is complex and has the potential for large earthquakes.

Structure
Initially between 10 to 5 million years ago the rift developed in a back arc region to the now extinct Coromandel volcanoes. It has a basement of mesozoic greywacke and argillite and at least two andesitic volcanoes erupted within it.
To the north the rift is filled with 2.5-3 km thick Tertiary and Quaternary terrestrial sediments and beyond Waiheke Island it opens up into an oceanic basin. Early work suggested the northern boundary might come ashore in Northland, near Whangārei and that the southern boundary while modified by events after the formation of the Mangakino caldera complex continued to be active.  Work using geolocation on the Hauraki Rift reveals a widening rate of /year although some of the raw data suggests that at the Te Poi end it might be up to /year which would be consistent with this. However in this region it is now dominated by the much more recent Taupō Rift (2 million years old at most) associated with the Taupō Volcanic Zone (TVZ) to which it is off-set by 60 degrees. TVZ eruptive output of 240,000 years ago, being Mamaku ignimbrite from the Rotorua caldera has filled in the far southern extremes.

Geothermal activity
Thermal springs along the rift edges and center are found throughout the region with a heat output of the order of 6.5MW in total.

Other Context
At the far side of the Coromandel Peninsula there is a parallel structure of Late Miocene/Quaternary origin extending north, that has been called the East Coromandel Rift. To the south east is the Tauranga Volcanic Centre which is likely related to activity in the old Taupō Volcanic Zone and the postulated Omanawa Caldera would have been at the intersection of the two rifts about 2 million years ago.

References

+
Thames-Coromandel District
Firth of Thames
Hauraki District
Geology of New Zealand
Geologic formations of New Zealand